A Sea of Her Own is a 2017 South Korea morning soap opera starring Oh Seung-ah, Kim Joo-yong, Han Yoo-yi and Choi Sung-jae. It aired on KBS2 from February 27, 2017 on Mondays to Fridays at 09:00 for 120 episodes.

It is the 42nd TV Novel series (11th in 2010s) of KBS.

Summary 
Set in the 1960s and 1970s, Yoon Soo In is consistently a top-ranked student in school, but due to her family's struggling financial circumstances, she begins to work at a factory instead of going to college. She nevertheless pursues her dreams.

Cast

Main 
 Oh Seung-ah as Yoon Soo-in 
 Kim Joo-yong as Choi Jung-wook 
 Han Yoo-yi as Jung Se-young 
 Choi Sung-jae as Kim Sun-woo

Supporting

People around Soo-in 
 Lee Dae-yeon as Yoon Dong-chul 
 Park Hyun-suk as Park Soon-ok 
 Lee Hyun-kyung as Lee Young-sun
 Han Eun-Seo as Yoon Jung-in
 Kim Tae-seol as Yoon Min-jae
 Kim Do-yeon as Yoon Dal-ja
 Choi Woo-suk as Kang Tae-soo
 Chae Min-hee as Oh Seol-hee

Taesan Noodle Factory 
 Kim Seung-wook as Jung Jae-man 
 Lee Kan-hee as Hong Sook-hee 
 Son Jong-bum as Hong Man-pyo

Ratings 
In this table, The blue numbers represent the lowest ratings and the red numbers represent the highest ratings.
NR denotes that the drama did not rank in the top 20 daily programs on that date.

Awards and nominations

References

External links
  

Korean Broadcasting System television dramas
Korean-language television shows
2017 South Korean television series debuts
2017 South Korean television series endings
Television shows set in Incheon